The Black Eagle tank (Čërnyj Orël, Chyornyy Oryol) or Object 640 was a presumed prototype main battle tank produced in the Russian Federation. Being based upon the T-80U, it was developed by the KBTM design bureau of Omsktransmash in the late 1990s. The Black Eagle has been cancelled, with all production and development halted in 2009.

The company that was developing the tank, Omsktransmash, went bankrupt with its designs and projects having been absorbed into Uralvagonzavod and state owned services. Before the acquisition Uralvagonzavod was developing the T-95 in competition to the Black Eagle, and then owned the rights to both projects. However, the Russian government withdrew all support and funding for both projects and they were superceded by the T-14 Armata, which was also being developed by Uralvagonzavod.

Development 
Development started during the 1980s, when the design bureau of the Leningrad Kirov Plant (LKZ) developed a new design based on the stretched T-80U chassis. Later, when the bureau closed, the documentation was transferred to KBTM in Omsk.

A mock-up of the Black Eagle was first demonstrated at the VTTV arms exposition in Omsk, in September 1997, making a single brief pass, far from the reviewing stands. The tank appeared to be a elongated T-80U hull, topped by a very large turret and gun, obscured by camouflage netting and canvas. The turret later turned out to be a crude mock-up.

An early prototype was shown at an arms exposition in Siberia, in June 1999. This tank had an elongated hull with seven pairs of road wheels instead of the T-80's six, and a turret still mostly obscured by camouflage netting.

The tank was based on a lengthened T-80U hull, with an extra pair of road wheels and a brand new turret. It appeared to have had very thick front armour and new-generation Kaktus explosive reactive armour on the hull and turret. The turret had a very large, box-shaped turret bustle instead of the traditional dome shape of previous Soviet and Russian main battle tanks.

In Russian reports, the Black Eagle design had abandoned the carousel-style autoloader in the fighting compartment for an autoloader mounted in the large western-style turret bustle, which incorporates a blow-out armoured ammunition compartment for crew safety, like the U.S. M1 Abrams, the German Leopard 2, British Challenger 2, French Leclerc and several other modern western tanks. The prototype had a 125 mm tank gun, but it was stated that it may have accommodated a larger 152 mm gun (compared to the 120 and 125 mm-calibre guns of main battle tanks in service). There was debate about whether the Black Eagle would incorporate the Drozd or Arena countermeasure.

Cancellation
The Black Eagle project was formally cancelled in 2001 by Omsktransmash. Development of the Black Eagle was stopped due to financial problems, questions about the reliability of the design and most importantly, the terrible performance of the T-80 upon which it was modeled, in the first Chechen war. The T-80 performed so poorly that after the conflict General-Lieutenant A. Galkin, the head of the Armor Directorate, convinced the Minister of Defence to never again procure tanks with gas-turbine engines. This included the Black Eagle, which was later cancelled in 2009. Omsktransmash attempted to appeal the decision, but were unable to pursue the appeal after filing for bankruptcy in 2002.

Colonel Vladimir Voitov, head of research at the Main Directorate of the Armored Troops, denied the existence of the tank in an interview with the Echo Moskvy radio in September 2009. "There was no such project...and those 20-year-old pictures show a mock-up of a futuristic tank which remained just a product of someone's imagination," ... "the turret of the vehicle did not have anything inside." In late 2011 it was announced that some technical solutions developed for the Black Eagle tank and Uralvagonzavods Object 195 (T-95) will be incorporated into the Armata Universal Combat Platform.

Description

Autoloader 
The Object 640 combined the carousel autoloader of the T-80U in the turret basket together with another autoloader in on the turret bustle, unlike other Soviet and Russian tanks of the time. The turret bustle part of the autoloader housed all propellant charges and some projectiles while the carousel autoloader only held less volatile projectiles that were part of the two-part ammunition. This new autoloader also allowed for longer APFSDS ammunition due to not being restricted by the dimensions of the carousel autoloader, which allowed for increased penetration.

Notes

References
 Jim Warford (1998). “The Resurrection of Russian Armor: Surprises from Siberia”, in Armor vol. 108, no. 5, pp 30–33. Fort Knox, KY: US Army Armor Center. ISSN 0004-2420.

External links 
 Vasiliy Fofanov's Modern Russian Armour - click "Black Eagle MBT" in the links in the left-hand frame.

Tanks with autoloaders
Post–Cold War main battle tanks
Main battle tanks of Russia
Trial and research tanks
Omsktransmash products